Campomanesia lundiana, also known as the Rio de Janeiro myrtle, was a species of plant in the family Myrtaceae. Before modern extinction, the plant was endemic to Rio de Janeiro state, within the Atlantic Forest ecoregion in southeastern Brazil.

References

lundiana
Extinct plants
Endemic flora of Brazil
Flora of Rio de Janeiro (state)
Flora of the Atlantic Forest
Extinct biota of South America
Plant extinctions since 1500
Taxonomy articles created by Polbot